Welli Hilli Park (웰리힐리파크), formerly known as Hyundai Sungwoo Resort is a ski resort in Hoengseong, South Korea. The resort was opened in December 1995 by Sungwoo Group, a family company with Hyundai Group. The resort was acquired by Shinan Group in 2011 and took the current name in 2012.

The slopes are located on the north face of the peak.

In Pyeongchang's bid for the 2010 Winter Olympics, it was the venue for the sledding events (bobsleigh, luge, and skeleton) and snowboarding events. But Pyeongchang lost the bid to Vancouver.

The resort town is served by the Dunnae Station. Across the nearby Dunnae Tunnel, another ski resort, Phoenix Pyeongchang is located.

In 2018 while human athletes were competing in the 2018 Winter Olympics nearby Welli Hilli Park hosted a skiing event for robots, competing for a $10,000 prize.

See also 
 List of ski areas and resorts in South Korea

References

External links 
 Official website

Ski areas and resorts in South Korea
Sports venues in Gangwon Province, South Korea
Hoengseong County